The Association for Logic, Language and Information (FoLLI) is an international, especially European, learned society. It was founded in 1991 "to advance the practicing of research and education on the interfaces between Logic, Linguistics, Computer Science and Cognitive Science and related disciplines." The academic journal Journal of Logic, Language and Information (JoLLI) is published under its auspices; it co-ordinates summer schools such as the European Summer School in Logic, Language and Information (ESSLLI), the North American Summer School in Logic, Language, and Information (NASSLLI), and the International Conference and Second East-Asian School on Logic, Language and Computation (EASLLC); and it awards the E. W. Beth Dissertation Prize to outstanding dissertations in the fields of Logic, Language, and Information.

Governance
The current president of FoLLI is Larry Moss (since 2020). The current management board consists of Larry Moss (president), Sonja Smets (vice president), Natasha Alechina (secretary), Nina Gierasimczuk (treasurer), Valentin Goranko (senior member), Darja Fiser, Benedikt Löwe, Louise McNally, and Pritty Patel-Grosz.

Past Presidents include 
Johan van Benthem (1991-1995),
Wilfrid Hodges (1995-1996),
Erhard Hinrichs (1997-1998),
Paul Gochet (1999-2001),
Hans Uzskoreit (2002-2003), 
Luigia Carlucci Aiello (2004-2007), 
Michael Moortgat (2007-2012), 
Ann Copestake (2012-2016), 
and Valentin Goranko (2016-2020).

See also
 Dynamic semantics
 Generalized quantifier
 Information theory
 Type theory

References

Bibliography
 Program for ESSLLI 2012: Opole
 Program for ESSLLI 2009: Bordeaux
 Program for ESSLLI 2008: Hamburg
 Program for ESSLLI 2007: Dublin
 Program for ESSLLI 2006: Málaga
 Program for ESSLLI 2005: Edinburgh

External links
 Association for Logic, Language and Information — FoLLI official home page

Academic conferences
Computer science organizations
Mathematical logic organizations
Philosophical logic
Philosophy organizations
Organizations established in 1991
Linguistics organizations
1991 establishments in France